Auricchio is an Italian cheese-making company, based in Cremona.

History
Founded in 1877 at San Giuseppe Vesuviano in the province of Naples, Gennaro Auricchio was the creator of a special rennet to produce provolone.

By the 1880s it was exporting cheese to the United States, for stocking in Little Italy's shops. This growth created need for new facilities, with a dairy added in Cremona before 1900.

Modern production
Today, Auricchio also has plants in:
Macomer (Nuoro) for Pecorino Romano D.O.P. and other fresh and mature sheep cheeses
Scandiano (Reggio Emilia) for production of “caciotta” (roundish small soft cheese) and “ricotta”
Solignano (Parma) specialized in the production of “Parmigiano Reggiano”

Products
The company is the largest producer of provolone cheese in Italy, and offers a significant range of dairy products:
 Provolone (sharp, mild and smoked)
 Parmigiano-Reggiano
 Grana Padano
 Pecorino Romano (protected designation of origin)
 A large assortment of fresh and seasoned pecorino cheeses

See also
 List of companies of Italy

References

Further reading 

 

Dairy products companies of Italy
Italian companies established in 1877
Italian brands
Companies based in Cremona
Food and drink companies established in 1877